The Canadian Motor was a Canadian electric car manufactured from 1900 until 1902.

Billed as being "ideal for any first-class automobilist to drive", the cars could travel up to 45 miles on one change of their batteries.  Although located in Toronto, the concern which built Canadian Motors was English-owned; models were derived from the first electrics manufactured in Canada, designed from 1893 by W. J. Still.  Still designed a gasoline-powered car as well, a 5 hp model built in 1898.  This was controlled by a steering column which could move backwards and forwards, thus providing forward or reverse motion.

References
David Burgess Wise, The New Illustrated Encyclopedia of Automobiles.

Defunct motor vehicle manufacturers of Canada
1900 establishments in Ontario
1902 disestablishments in Ontario
Electric vehicle manufacturers of Canada
Canadian companies established in 1900
History of manufacturing in Ontario